Golf View is a neighborhood within the South Tampa district of Tampa. As of the 2010 census the neighborhood had a population of 226. The ZIP Codes serving the area are 33609 and 33629.

Geography
Golf View boundaries are Palma Ceia to the south, Palma Ceia West to the west, New Suburb Beautiful to the east and Grey Gables to the north

Demographics
Source: Hillsborough County Atlas

At the 2010 census there were 226 people and 87 households residing in the neighborhood. The population density was 2,326/mi2. The racial makeup of the neighborhood was 94% White, 3% African American, 1% Native American, 1% Asian, 0% from other races, and 1% from two or more races. Hispanic or Latino of any race were about 7%.

Of the 87 households 35% had children under the age of 18 living with them, 58% were married couples living together, 8% had a female householder with no husband present, and 6% were non-families. 28% of households were made up of individuals.

The age distribution was 26% under the age of 18, 10% from 18 to 34, 24% from 35 to 49, 24% from 50 to 64, and 13% 65 or older. For every 100 females, there were 97.4 males.

The per capita income for the neighborhood was $70,941. About 2% of the population were below the poverty line.

See also
Neighborhoods in Tampa, Florida

References

External links
Golfview Neighborhood Association

Neighborhoods in Tampa, Florida